The Los Angeles City Council, 1889–1909, was the legislative body of Los Angeles, California, under the first charter of the city, granted by the Legislature in 1889. The first election under that charter was held on February 21, 1889, and the last on December 4, 1906.

History 
In 1888, voters adopted the a city charter, which took effect in 1889, with top officials elected for two year terms. In 1909, due to the ward system leading to corruption in the City Council, citizens voted to replace the nine-ward system with an at-large system and instituted nonpartisan elections before the state constitution was amended to require it for all local elections two years later. It was succeeded by an at large-election system.

Wards
The city was divided into nine wards, with a councilman elected from each by plurality vote.

1st Ward
". . . northerly by the north city boundary between the Los Angeles River and the east boundary of the city; easterly by the east boundary of the city, between the northern boundary of the city and Mission Street; southerly by Mission Street, from the east city boundary to its intersection with Mission road; Mission road, from its intersection with Mission street, to its junction with Mission road, to the Los Angeles River; westerly by the Los Angeles River, from Macy street, northerly to the north boundary of the city."

2nd Ward
". . . northerly by the north city boundary, from its west boundary to the Los Angeles River, easterly by the Los Angeles River from the north city boundary to Downey avenue; Downey avenue, from the Los Angeles River to San Fernando street; San Fernando street; from Downey avenue to Upper Main street; Upper Main Street. from San Fernando Street to Marchessault street; Main street, from Marchessault street to First street; southerly by First street, from Main street to Canal street; thence along Canal street to Diamond street westerly to the west city boundary, from Diamond street to the north city boundary."

3rd Ward
". . . northerly by Diamond street, from the west boundary to Canal street; Canal street, from Diamond street to First street; First street, from Canal street to Main street; easterly by Main street, from First street to Seventh street; southerly by Seventh street, from Main street to west city boundary; westerly by the west city boundary, from Seventh street to Diamond street."

4th Ward
". . . northerly by Seventh street, from west city boundary to Main street, easterly by Main street, from Seventh street to Washington street; southerly by Washington street, from Main street to west city boundary; westerly by west city boundary, from Washington street to Seventh street."

5th Ward
". . . northerly by Washington street, from the west city boundary to Main street; easterly by Main street, from Washington street to south city boundary; southerly by the south city boundary from Main street to the southwesterly corner of the city; westerly by the west city boundary from the southwesterly corner of the city to Washington street."

6th Ward
" . . . northerly by Ninth street, from Main street to the Los Angeles River; easterly by Los Angeles River, from Ninth street to the south city boundary; southerly by the south city boundary, from the Los Angeles River to Main street; westerly by Main street, from the south city boundary to Ninth street."

7th Ward
". . . northerly by First Street, from Main street to the Los Angeles River; easterly by the Los Angeles River, from First street to Ninth street; southerly by Ninth street from the Los Angeles River to Main street; westerly by Main street, from Ninth street to First street."

8th Ward
". . . westerly and northerly by Main street, from First street to Marchessault street; Upper Main street, from Marchessault street to San Fernando street; San Fernando street, from Upper Main street to Downey avenue; Downey avenue, from San Fernando street to the Los Angeles River; easterly by the Los Angeles River from Downey avenue to First street; southerly by First street from the Los Angeles River to Main street."

9th Ward
". . . northerly by Macy street, from the Los Angeles River to its junction with Mission road; Mission road from its junction with Macy street to its intersection with Mission street; Mission street from its intersection with Mission road, to the east city boundary; easterly by the east city boundary, from Mission street to the southeasterly corner of the city to the Los Angeles River; westerly by the Los Angeles river, from the south city boundary to Macy street."

Members

See also

 Los Angeles Common Council
 Los Angeles City Council

References

For the boundaries: "The Election," Los Angeles Times, February 6, 1889, page 2 A library card may be necessary to access this link.

For everything else: Chronological Record of Los Angeles City Officials 1850–1938, Municipal Reference Library, March 1938, reprinted 1946.

Government of Los Angeles
California city councils